Juan Manuel Lara (born January 26, 1981 in Azua, Dominican Republic) is a former Major League Baseball relief pitcher. He was signed by Cleveland as an amateur free agent in May  and was called up to the major league club on September 5, .

Minor league Career
Lara played for the Dominican Indians (1999–), Burlington Indians, Mahoning Valley Scrappers, Lake County Captains (2003), Kinston Indians (–), Akron Aeros (2005–), and Buffalo Bisons (-2007). He worked as a starting pitcher from 2000 through the first half of 2003 and has worked primarily out of the bullpen since then compiling a minor league record of 24–28, 16 saves, a 3.96 ERA and 443 strike outs in  innings. He became a free agent at the end of the  season.

Accident
Lara was involved in a serious automobile accident on the night of November 24, 2007, in his homeland of the Dominican Republic. His car was struck at an intersection by a motorcycle. Both occupants of the motorcycle were killed instantly, while Lara was taken to a Dominican Republic hospital with life-threatening injuries, including broken ribs, a broken D2 vertebra and possible brain damage. His injuries were considered to be possibly career-ending.

On March 12, Lara was released from the Indians' 40-man roster; he was subsequently re-signed to a minor league contract despite the fact that he was to miss the entire 2008 season. The Indians organization will handle all of Lara's medical expenses.

Return from injuries
After wearing a halo vest to support his neck and surgeries on his spine and arms, Lara reported to the Indians' training camp on March 31, 2009.

References

External links

Tribe's Lara Still in Critical Condition

1981 births
Living people
Akron Aeros players
Arizona League Indians players
Buffalo Bisons (minor league) players
Burlington Indians players (1986–2006)
Cleveland Indians players
Dominican Republic expatriate baseball players in the United States
Kinston Indians players
Lake County Captains players

Major League Baseball pitchers
Major League Baseball players from the Dominican Republic
Mahoning Valley Scrappers players